"Struggle No More (The Main Event)" is a collaborative soundtrack single by Anthony Hamilton, Jaheim, and Musiq Soulchild. Led exclusively by airplay, it entered the Hot R&B/Hip-Hop Songs chart at number fifty-seven the week of March 3, 2007, subsequently reaching number thirty-two.

Charts

2007 singles
Anthony Hamilton (musician) songs
Jaheim songs
Songs written for films
2006 songs
Atlantic Records singles